The Up and Coming Stakes is an Australian Turf Club Group 3 Thoroughbred horse race for three-year-old colts and geldings, run as a quality handicap over a distance of 1300 metres at Randwick Racecourse, Sydney, Australia in August. Prizemoney is A$200,000.

History
The race is considered a good start to returning to racing in the new racing calendar for talented three-year-olds gearing up for an Australian spring campaign. The race is often won by a classy three-year-old, as evidenced by the honour roll of past winners. Top class gallopers Fastnet Rock, Exceed and Excel, Testa Rossa and General Nediym who won this race, each of these gallopers went on to become genuine stars.

Name
The race is named in honour of the 1959 Warwick Stakes and Canterbury Stakes winner  Up And Coming.  The race is held on the same racecard as the Warwick Stakes.

Distance
 1980–1988 – 1200 metres
 1989 – 1160 metres
 1990–2010 – 1200 metres
 2011 onwards - 1300 metres

Grade
 1979 - Listed race
 1980–1992 - Group 3
 1993–2004 - Group 2
 2005–2012 - Group 3
 2013 - Group 2
 2014 onwards - Group 3

Venue
1979–1992 - Warwick Farm Racecourse 
1993–1996 - Randwick Racecourse
1997–1999 - Warwick Farm Racecourse 
 2000 - Canterbury Park Racecourse
2001–2004 - Warwick Farm Racecourse 
2005–2006 - Randwick Racecourse
 2008 - Warwick Farm Racecourse
 2009 - Randwick Racecourse
2010–2013 - Warwick Farm Racecourse
 2014–2020 - Randwick Racecourse
 2021 - Kembla Grange Racecourse
 2022 - Rosehill Racecourse

Winners

 2022 - Kibou 
 2021 - Tiger Of Malay 
 2020 - North Pacific 
 2019 - True Detective 
 2018 - Master Ash
 2017 - Dracarys
 2016 - Divine Prophet
 2015 - Shards
 2014 - Scissor Kick
 2013 - War
 2012 - Albrecht
 2011 - Manawanui
 2010 - Blackball
 2009 - Rarefied
 2008 - Dreamscape
 2007 - †race not held
 2006 - Court Command
 2005 - Snitzel
 2004 - Fastnet Rock
 2003 - Exceed And Excel
 2002 - Snowland
 2001 - Newquay
 2000 - Zariz
 1999 - Testa Rossa
 1998 - Paris Dream
 1997 - General Nediym
 1996 - Paint
 1995 - Our Maizcay
 1994 - Bulldog Yeats
 1993 - Mahogany
 1992 - West End
 1991 - Kinjite
 1990 - The Bullfighter
 1989 - Patronise
 1988 - Star Watch
 1987 - Sky Chase
 1986 - Broad Reach
 1985 - Timothy
 1984 - Royal Troubador
 1983 - Sir Dapper
 1982 - Marscay 
 1981 - Best Western
 1980 - John's Hero 
 1979 - Spear 

† Not held because of outbreak of equine influenza

See also
 List of Australian Group races
 Group races

External links 
 Up And Coming Stakes (ATC)

References

Horse races in Australia